Remegio Vista (born 25 May 1934) is a Filipino sprinter. He competed in the men's 4 × 100 metres relay at the 1960 Summer Olympics.

Early life
Remegio Vista was born on May 25, 1934 in Tibiao, Antique in the Philippines.

Career
Vista competed three times in the Asian Games (1958, 1962, 1966), where he won 2 gold medals and a bronze medal. He also competed at the 1960 Summer Olympics in Rome.

Asian Games
On the 1958 Asian Games in Tokyo, he competed in the men's 4 × 100 metres relay with Isaac Gomez, Pedro Subido and Enrique Bautista. They won the gold medal at the end of the event.

On the 1962 Asian Games in Jakarta, he competed again in the men's 4 × 100 metres relay with Isaac Gomez, Claro Pellosis and Rogelio Onofre. They won the gold medal once again at the end of the event.

When he competed at the 1966 Asian Games in Bangkok with Rogelio Onofre, Arnulfo Valles and William Mordeno in the men's 4 × 100 metres relay, they finished in 3rd place and got a bronze medal.

Olympic Games
He competed at the 1960 Summer Olympics in Rome with Isaac Gomez, Enrique Bautista and Rogelio Onofre but only finished in 4th place in the men's 4 × 100 metres relay.

References

External links
 

1934 births
Living people
Athletes (track and field) at the 1960 Summer Olympics
Filipino male sprinters
Olympic track and field athletes of the Philippines
Place of birth missing (living people)
Asian Games medalists in athletics (track and field)
Asian Games gold medalists for the Philippines
Asian Games bronze medalists for the Philippines
Athletes (track and field) at the 1958 Asian Games
Athletes (track and field) at the 1962 Asian Games
Athletes (track and field) at the 1966 Asian Games
Medalists at the 1958 Asian Games
Medalists at the 1962 Asian Games
Medalists at the 1966 Asian Games